Dimitrova Peak is the mostly ice-covered peak rising to 1903 m in eastern Havre Mountains, northern Alexander Island in Antarctica. It has steep and partly ice-free southwest slopes, and surmounts Russian Gap to the northeast and Foreman Glacier to the south. The vicinity was visited on 8 January 1988 by the geological survey team of Christo Pimpirev and Borislav Kamenov (First Bulgarian Antarctic Expedition), and Philip Nell and Peter Marquis (British Antarctic Survey).

The feature is named after the Bulgarian opera singer Ghena Dimitrova (1941-2005).

Location
British mapping in 1971.

Maps
 British Antarctic Territory. Scale 1:200000 topographic map. DOS 610 – W 69 70. Tolworth, UK, 1971
 Antarctic Digital Database (ADD). Scale 1:250000 topographic map of Antarctica. Scientific Committee on Antarctic Research (SCAR). Since 1993, regularly upgraded and updated

Notes

References
 Bulgarian Antarctic Gazetteer. Antarctic Place-names Commission. (details in Bulgarian, basic data in English)
 Dimitrova Peak. SCAR Composite Gazetteer of Antarctica

External links
 Dimitrova Peak. Copernix satellite image

Mountains of Alexander Island
Bulgaria and the Antarctic